Scaevola cunninghamii is a spreading perennial plant in the family Goodeniaceae.

Description
Scaevola cunninghamii is a spreading perennial herb or shrub which grows to a height of 0.15 to 0.8 m. Its blue-purple/white flowers may be seen from May to October.

Distribution and habitat
It is found in the IBRA Regions of Carnarvon, the Gascoyne, the Murchison, the Pilbara, and the Yalgoo, growing on sand, in sandhills and limestone rises.

References

cunninghamii
Eudicots of Western Australia
Asterales of Australia
Plants described in 1839
Taxa named by Augustin Pyramus de Candolle